Holy Cross Airport  is a state-owned public-use airport located one mile (1.6 km) south of the central business district of Holy Cross, a city in the Yukon-Koyukuk Census Area of the U.S. state of Alaska.

History 
Although most U.S. airports use the same three-letter location identifier for the FAA and IATA, Holy Cross Airport is assigned HCA by the FAA and HCR by the IATA.

Holy Cross Airport has one runway (1/19) with a gravel and dirt surface measuring 4,000 x 100 ft. (1,219 x 30 m).

Airlines and destinations

References

External links 
 Alaska FAA airport diagram (GIF)

Airports in the Yukon–Koyukuk Census Area, Alaska